is a Japanese yuri manga series written and illustrated by Kodama Naoko. The series follows Machi Morimoto, a woman who enters into a same-sex sham marriage with her kōhai (junior). I Married My Best Friend To Shut My Parents Up was serialized in the manga magazine Comic Yuri Hime in 2018 and collected into a bound volume by Ichijinsha that same year, and was licensed for an English-language release by Seven Seas Entertainment in 2019.

Synopsis
Machi Morimoto, an office lady in her early thirties, feels pressured by her parents to find a husband and settle down. Her friend and kōhai Hana Agaya, in need of a new apartment, suggests they move in together and enter a sham marriage by obtaining a partnership certificate. While Machi is hesitant about the arrangement  Hana is a lesbian who expressed romantic feelings for Machi in their youth, and unbeknownst to Machi, still harbors feelings for her  she agrees. Their relationship grows into a pleasant cohabitation, and as they overcome various hardships (including the homophobia of Machi's parents and the return of Hana's ex-girlfriend Ayaka), Machi begins to develop feelings for Hana. The series concludes with the couple entering into a genuine romantic relationship.

Media
I Married My Best Friend To Shut My Parents Up was originally serialized in Comic Yuri Hime from June to August 2018, and collected into a bound volume by Ichijinsha. In September 2018, Seven Seas Entertainment announced that it would be publishing an English-language translation of the series, which was published in June 2019. The manga was creator Kodama Naoko's first serialized work following the conclusion of her earlier NTR: Netsuzou Trap; Naoko called the series "the first work by 'Light Kodama' in a long time," in reference to the comedic tone of I Married My Best Friend To Shut My Parents Up relative to the darker tone of NTR.

Reception
The series has received mixed to positive reviews. Reviewing the series for Otaku USA, David Estrella praised the series' romantic comedy elements but noted that readers seeking a realistic story about lesbian relationships "may find it too fluffy". Erica Friedman of Yuricon expressed a similar sentiment, stating that while the series "isn’t problematic," its gag comic humor "doesn’t feel like a sincere attempt to address [LGBT] issues." Rebecca Silverman of Anime News Network remarked that while the series compares favorably to Naoko's earlier NTR: Netsuzou Trap, she criticized its story for being underdeveloped.

References

External links
 

2018 manga
Lesbian fiction
LGBT in anime and manga
Romance anime and manga
Ichijinsha manga
Seven Seas Entertainment titles
Yuri (genre) anime and manga
2010s LGBT literature